The Slovak National Football League was the second-tier football league of Czechoslovakia and the top division in Slovak Socialist Republic.

History
 1969 – Founded as 3. liga, skupina "C" (Czechoslovak third league, group C)
 1974 – Renamed to Slovenská národná futbalová liga (Slovak national football league)
 1981 – Renamed to 1. slovenská národná futbalová liga (Slovak first national football league)
 1993 – Officially dissolved. Top 6 teams created the new Slovak Super Liga, along with all 6 Slovak teams from Czechoslovak First League.

 
Czechoslovakia